El medio pelo is a Mexican telenovela produced by Carlos Bravo for Telesistema Mexicano in 1966.

Cast 
Magda Guzmán as Paz
Eric del Castillo as Guadalupe Marcial
Irma Lozano as Aurorita Pérez García
Carlos Riquelme as Abundio
Virginia Manzano
Luis Manuel Pelayo
Celia Manzano
Jorge Ortiz de Pinedo
Delia Magaña
Pilar Sen
María Eugenia Ríos

References

External links 

Mexican telenovelas
1966 telenovelas
Televisa telenovelas
Spanish-language telenovelas
1966 Mexican television series debuts
1966 Mexican television series endings